Banište is a village in the municipality of Debar, North Macedonia. It is located close to the Albanian border.

Demographics
Banište (Banishta) is recorded in the Ottoman defter of 1467 as a village in the vilayet of Upper Dibra. The settlement had a total of 10 households with the anthroponymy attested being of a mixed Albanian-Slavic character with instances of Slavicisation (e.g., Gjon Popovići): Gjorgo Papriçi; Istanec, brother of the aforementioned; Nikolla, brother of the aforementioned; Kojo, son of Gjergj; Gjorgo, son of Istepan; Gjon Popovići; Dimitri, brother of the aforementioned; Progon, brother of the aforementioned; Ninec, brother of Kojo; and Istanec, brother of Gjorgo.      

As of the 2021 census, Banište had 35 residents with the following ethnic composition:
Albanians 28
Persons for whom data are taken from administrative sources 4
Macedonians 3

According to the 2002 census, the village had a total of 90 inhabitants. Ethnic groups in the village include:
Albanians 80
Macedonians 10

References

External links

Villages in Debar Municipality
Albanian communities in North Macedonia